Oreophryne atrigularis is a species of frog in the family Microhylidae. It is endemic to Western New Guinea (Indonesia) and known from its type locality, the Wondiwoi Mountains at the base of the Wandammen Peninsula, and from another location further east between Nabire and Mapia.

Description
Adult males measure  in snout–vent length. An adult female measures , whereas a female measuring 22 mm appears to be a sub-adult. The head is broader than it is long; the snout is tapering and projecting. The tympanum is covered by skin and barely visible. The fingers and toes have discs with circummarginal grooves. The colouration is dorsally beige (sometimes greyish-brown) with some spots and marbling. About one half of animals have a conspicuous whitish mid-dorsal line that has blackish borders, and similarly many have a W-shaped mark in the scapular area, surrounding two whitish spots. The throat is black (hence the specific name atrigularis, from Latin ater for "black" and gularis for "belonging to throat") grading posteriorly into dark brown or dark grey marbling; the female and one male have pale grey throat. Males have a single internal subgular vocal sac.

Habitat and conservation
Development is presumably direct (i.e., no free-living tadpole stage).

Some selective logging is taking place in the range of this species, but probably not to an extent that would pose a serious threat. Oreophryne atrigularis in the Wandamen Nature Reserve, but this is not securing it from logging. It was abundant at its type locality.

References

atrigularis
Amphibians of Western New Guinea
Endemic fauna of New Guinea
Endemic fauna of Indonesia
Amphibians described in 2001
Taxa named by Rainer Günther
Taxa named by Stephen J. Richards
Taxonomy articles created by Polbot